Nadine Kraus (born 14 February 1988) is a German footballer who plays as a midfielder for 1. FFC Recklinghausen. She studied at Friedrich Schiller University during her career.

Career

Statistics

References

External links
 

1988 births
Living people
German women's footballers
Women's association football midfielders
Frauen-Bundesliga players
2. Frauen-Bundesliga players
1. FC Saarbrücken (women) players
SGS Essen players
FF USV Jena players
VfL Bochum (women) players
People from Weiden in der Oberpfalz
Sportspeople from the Upper Palatinate
Footballers from Bavaria